Pareuptychia is a genus of satyrid butterflies found in the Neotropical realm.

Species
Listed alphabetically:
Pareuptychia binocula (Butler, 1869)
Pareuptychia difficilis Forster, 1964
Pareuptychia hervei Brévignon, 2005
Pareuptychia hesionides Forster, 1964
Pareuptychia lydia (Cramer, 1777)
Pareuptychia metaleuca (Boisduval, 1870)
Pareuptychia ocirrhoe (Fabricius, 1776)
Pareuptychia summandosa (Gosse, 1880)

References

Euptychiina
Nymphalidae of South America
Butterfly genera
Taxa named by Walter Forster (entomologist)